Juncus is a genus of monocotyledonous flowering plants, commonly known as rushes. It is the largest genus in the family Juncaceae, containing around 300 species.

Description
Rushes of the genus Juncus are herbaceous plants that superficially resemble grasses or sedges. They have historically received little attention from botanists; in his 1819 monograph, James Ebenezer Bicheno described the genus as "obscure and uninviting".

The form of the flower differentiates rushes from grasses or sedges. The flowers of Juncus comprise five whorls of floral parts: three sepals, three petals (or, taken together, six tepals), two to six stamens (in two whorls) and a stigma with three lobes. The stems are round in cross-section, unlike those of sedges, which are typically somewhat triangular in cross-section.

In Juncus section Juncotypus (formerly called Juncus subg. Genuini), which contains some of the most widespread and familiar species, the leaves are reduced to sheaths around the base of the stem and the bract subtending the inflorescence closely resembles a continuation of the stem, giving the appearance that the inflorescence is lateral.

Distribution and ecology
Juncus has a cosmopolitan distribution, with species found throughout the world, with the exception of Antarctica. They typically grow in cold or wet habitats, and in the tropics, are most common in montane environments.

Fossil record
Several fossil fruits of a Juncus species have been described from middle Miocene strata of the Fasterholt area near Silkeborg in Central Jutland, Denmark.

Classification

The genus Juncus was first named by Carl Linnaeus in his 1753 . The type species of the genus was designated by Frederick Vernon Coville, who in 1913 chose the first species in Linnaeus' account, Juncus acutus. Juncus can be divided into two major groups, one group with cymose inflorescences that include bracteoles, and one with racemose inflorescences with no bracteoles.

The genus is divided into the following subgenera and sections:
 Juncus subg. Juncus
 sect. Juncus
 sect. Graminei (Engelm.) Engelm.
 sect. Caespitosi Cout.
 sect. Stygiopsis Kuntze
 sect. Ozophyllum Dumort.
 sect. Iridifolii Snogerup & Kirschner
 Juncus subg. Poiophylli Buchenau
 sect. Tenageia Dumort.
 sect. Steirochloa Griseb.
 sect. Juncotypus Dumort.
 sect. Forskalina Kuntze

Species

Plants of the World Online accepts the following species in the genus Juncus:

Juncus acuminatus Michx.
Juncus acutiflorus Ehrh. ex Hoffm.
Juncus acutus L.
Juncus aemulans Liebm.
Juncus alatus Franch. & Sav.
Juncus alexandri L.A.S.Johnson
Juncus allioides Franch.
Juncus alpigenus K.Koch
Juncus × alpiniformis Fernald
Juncus alpinoarticulatus Chaix
Juncus amabilis Edgar
Juncus amplifolius A.Camus
Juncus amuricus (Maxim.) V.I.Krecz. & Gontsch.
Juncus anatolicus Snogerup
Juncus anceps Laharpe
Juncus andersonii Buchenau
Juncus andinus Balslev
Juncus antarcticus Hook.f.
Juncus anthelatus (Wiegand) R.E.Brooks & Whittem.
Juncus arcticus Willd.
Juncus aridicola L.A.S.Johnson
Juncus articulatus L.
Juncus astreptus L.A.S.Johnson
Juncus atratus Krock.
Juncus australis Hook.f.
Juncus austrobrasiliensis Balslev
Juncus baekdusanensis M.Kim
Juncus balticus Willd.
Juncus bassianus L.A.S.Johnson
Juncus batrachium Veldkamp
Juncus benghalensis Kunth
Juncus beringensis Buchenau
Juncus biflorus Elliott
Juncus biglumis L.
Juncus biglumoides H.Hara
Juncus bolanderi Engelm.
Juncus brachycarpus Engelm.
Juncus brachycephalus (Engelm.) Buchenau
Juncus brachyphyllus Wiegand
Juncus brachyspathus Maxim.
Juncus brachystigma Sam.
Juncus brasiliensis Breistr.
Juncus brevibracteus L.A.S.Johnson
Juncus brevicaudatus (Engelm.) Fernald
Juncus breviculmis Balslev
Juncus breweri Engelm.
Juncus × brueggeri Domin
Juncus bryoides F.J.Herm.
Juncus bryophilus W.W.Sm.
Juncus bufonius L.
Juncus bulbosus L.
Juncus burkartii Barros
Juncus caesariensis Coville
Juncus caespiticius E.Mey.
Juncus canadensis J.Gay ex Laharpe
Juncus capensis Thunb.
Juncus capillaceus Lam.
Juncus capillaris F.J.Herm.
Juncus capitatus Weigel
Juncus castaneus Sm.
Juncus cephalostigma Sam.
Juncus cephalotes Thunb.
Juncus chiapasensis Balslev
Juncus chlorocephalus Engelm.
Juncus chrysocarpus Buchenau
Juncus clarkei Buchenau
Juncus compressus Jacq.
Juncus concinnus D.Don
Juncus concolor Sam.
Juncus confusus Coville
Juncus conglomeratus L.
Juncus continuus L.A.S.Johnson
Juncus cooperi Engelm.
Juncus cordobensis Barros
Juncus coriaceus Mack.
Juncus × correctus Steud.
Juncus covillei Piper
Juncus crassistylus A.Camus
Juncus curtisiae L.A.S.Johnson
Juncus curvatus Buchenau
Juncus cyperoides Laharpe
Juncus debilis A.Gray
Juncus decipiens (Buchenau) Nakai
Juncus × degenianus Boros
Juncus densiflorus Kunth
Juncus deosaicus Noltie
Juncus diastrophanthus Buchenau
Juncus dichotomus Elliott
Juncus diemii Barros
Juncus diffusissimus Buckley
Juncus × diffusus Hoppe
Juncus digitatus C.W.Witham & Zika
Juncus distegus Edgar
Juncus dolichanthus L.A.S.Johnson
Juncus dongchuanensis K.F.Wu
Juncus × donyanae Fern.-Carv.
Juncus dregeanus Kunth
Juncus drummondii E.Mey.
Juncus dubius Engelm.
Juncus dudleyi Wiegand
Juncus dulongjiongensis Novikov
Juncus durus L.A.S.Johnson & K.L.Wilson
Juncus duthiei (C.B.Clarke) Noltie
Juncus ebracteatus E.Mey.
Juncus echinocephalus Balslev
Juncus ecuadoriensis Balslev
Juncus edgariae L.A.S.Johnson & K.L.Wilson
Juncus effusus L.
Juncus elbrusicus Galushko
Juncus elliottii Chapm.
Juncus emmanuelis A.Fern. & J.G.García
Juncus engleri Buchenau
Juncus ensifolius Wikstr.
Juncus equisetinus Proskur.
Juncus ernesti-barrosi Barros
Juncus exiguus (Fernald & Wiegand) Lint ex Snogerup & P.F.Zika
Juncus exsertus Buchenau
Juncus falcatus E.Mey.
Juncus × fallax Trab.
Juncus fascinatus (M.C.Johnst.) W.M.Knapp
Juncus fauriei H.Lév. & Vaniot
Juncus fauriensis Buchenau
Juncus fernandez-carvajaliae Romero Zarco & Arán
Juncus filicaulis Buchenau
Juncus filiformis L.
Juncus filipendulus Buckley
Juncus fimbristyloides Noltie
Juncus firmus L.A.S.Johnson
Juncus flavidus L.A.S.Johnson
Juncus fockei Buchenau
Juncus foliosus Desf.
Juncus fominii Zoz
Juncus fontanesii J.Gay ex Laharpe
Juncus fugongensis S.Y.Bao
Juncus × fulvescens Fernald
Juncus ganeshii Miyam. & H.Ohba
Juncus georgianus Coville
Juncus gerardi Loisel.
Juncus giganteus Sam.
Juncus glaucoturgidus Noltie
Juncus gonggae Miyam. & H.Ohba
Juncus × gracilescens F.J.Herm. ex Wadmond
Juncus gracilicaulis A.Camus
Juncus gracillimus (Buchenau) V.I.Krecz. & Gontsch.
Juncus greenei Oakes & Tuck.
Juncus gregiflorus L.A.S.Johnson
Juncus grisebachii Buchenau
Juncus guadeloupensis Buchenau & Urb.
Juncus gubanovii Novikov
Juncus gymnocarpus Coville
Juncus haenkei E.Mey.
Juncus hallii Engelm.
Juncus harae Miyam. & H.Ohba
Juncus heldreichianus T.Marsson ex Parl.
Juncus hemiendytus F.J.Herm.
Juncus heptopotamicus V.I.Krecz. & Gontsch.
Juncus hesperius (Piper) Lint
Juncus heterophyllus Dufour
Juncus himalensis Klotzsch
Juncus holoschoenus R.Br.
Juncus homalocaulis F.Muell. ex Benth.
Juncus howellii F.J.Herm.
Juncus hybridus Brot.
Juncus hydrophilus Noltie
Juncus imbricatus Laharpe
Juncus inflexus L.
Juncus ingens N.A.Wakef.
Juncus interior Wiegand
Juncus × inundatus Drejer
Juncus jacquinii L.
Juncus jaxarticus V.I.Krecz. & Gontsch.
Juncus jinpingensis S.Y.Bao
Juncus kelloggii Engelm.
Juncus khasiensis Buchenau
Juncus kingii Rendle
Juncus kleinii Barros
Juncus krameri Franch. & Sav.
Juncus kraussii Hochst.
Juncus kuohii M.J.Jung
Juncus laccatus P.F.Zika
Juncus laeviusculus L.A.S.Johnson
Juncus lancangensis Y.Y.Qian
Juncus × langii Erdner
Juncus leiospermus F.J.Herm.
Juncus × lemieuxii B.Boivin
Juncus leptospermus Buchenau
Juncus lesueurii Bol.
Juncus leucanthus Royle ex D.Don
Juncus leucomelas Royle ex D.Don
Juncus liebmannii J.F.Macbr.
Juncus littoralis C.A.Mey.
Juncus llanquihuensis Barros
Juncus lomatophyllus Spreng.
Juncus longiflorus (A.Camus) Noltie
Juncus longii Fernald
Juncus longirostris Kuvaev
Juncus longistamineus A.Camus
Juncus longistylis Torr.
Juncus luciensis Ertter
Juncus luzuliformis Franch.
Juncus macrandrus Coville
Juncus macrantherus V.I.Krecz. & Gontsch.
Juncus macrophyllus Coville
Juncus marginatus Rostk.
Juncus maritimus Lam.
Juncus maroccanus Kirschner
Juncus maximowiczii Buchenau
Juncus megacephalus M.A.Curtis
Juncus megalophyllus S.Y.Bao
Juncus meianthus L.A.S.Johnson ex K.L.Wilson
Juncus membranaceus Royle
Juncus mertensianus Bong.
Juncus micranthus Schrad. ex E.Mey.
Juncus microcephalus Kunth
Juncus milashanensis A.M.Lu & Z.Y.Zhang
Juncus militaris Bigelow
Juncus minimus Buchenau
Juncus minutulus (Albert & Jahand.) Prain
Juncus modicus N.E.Br.
Juncus mollis L.A.S.Johnson
Juncus × montellii Vierh.
Juncus × montserratensis Marcet
Juncus × murbeckii Sagorski
Juncus mustangensis Miyam. & H.Ohba
Juncus nepalicus Miyam. & H.Ohba
Juncus nevadensis S.Watson
Juncus nodatus Coville
Juncus × nodosiformis Fernald
Juncus nodosus L.
Juncus novae-zelandiae Hook.f.
Juncus nupela Veldkamp
Juncus obliquus Adamson
Juncus × obotritorum Rothm.
Juncus occidentalis Wiegand
Juncus ochraceus Buchenau
Juncus ochrocoleus L.A.S.Johnson
Juncus orchonicus Novikov
Juncus × oronensis Fernald
Juncus orthophyllus Coville
Juncus oxycarpus E.Mey. ex Kunth
Juncus oxymeris Engelm.
Juncus pallescens Lam.
Juncus pallidus R.Br.
Juncus paludosus E.L.Bridges & Orzell
Juncus papillosus Franch. & Sav.
Juncus parryi Engelm.
Juncus patens E.Mey.
Juncus pauciflorus R.Br.
Juncus pelocarpus E.Mey.
Juncus perpusillus Sam.
Juncus persicus Boiss.
Juncus pervetus Fernald
Juncus petrophilus Miyam.
Juncus phaeanthus L.A.S.Johnson
Juncus phaeocephalus Engelm.
Juncus pictus Steud.
Juncus planifolius R.Br.
Juncus polyanthemus Buchenau
Juncus polycephalus Michx.
Juncus potaninii Buchenau
Juncus prismatocarpus R.Br.
Juncus procerus E.Mey.
Juncus prominens (Buchenau) Miyabe & Kudô
Juncus przewalskii Buchenau
Juncus psammophilus L.A.S.Johnson
Juncus punctorius L.f.
Juncus pusillus Buchenau
Juncus pygmaeus Rich. ex Thuill.
Juncus pylaei Laharpe
Juncus radula Buchenau
Juncus ramboi Barros
Juncus ranarius Songeon & E.P.Perrier
Juncus ratkowskyanus L.A.S.Johnson
Juncus rechingeri Snogerup
Juncus regelii Buchenau
Juncus remotiflorus L.A.S.Johnson
Juncus repens Michx.
Juncus requienii Parl.
Juncus revolutus R.Br.
Juncus rigidus Desf.
Juncus roemerianus Scheele
Juncus rohtangensis Goel & Aswal
Juncus × ruhmeri Asch. & Graebn.
Juncus rupestris Kunth
Juncus × sallandiae Corporaal & Schaminée
Juncus salsuginosus Turcz. ex C.A.Mey.
Juncus sandwithii Lourteig
Juncus sarophorus L.A.S.Johnson
Juncus saximontanus A.Nelson
Juncus scabriusculus Kunth
Juncus scheuchzerioides Gaudich.
Juncus scirpoides Lam.
Juncus secundus P.Beauv. ex Poir.
Juncus semisolidus L.A.S.Johnson
Juncus setchuensis Buchenau
Juncus sherei Miyam. & H.Ohba
Juncus sikkimensis Hook.f.
Juncus socotranus (Buchenau) Snogerup
Juncus sonderianus Buchenau
Juncus soranthus Schrenk
Juncus sorrentinoi Parl.
Juncus sparganiifolius Boiss. & Kotschy ex Buchenau
Juncus spectabilis Rendle
Juncus sphacelatus Decne.
Juncus sphaerocarpus Nees
Juncus spumosus Noltie
Juncus squarrosus L.
Juncus stenopetalus Adamson
Juncus stipulatus Nees & Meyen
Juncus striatus Schousb. ex E.Mey.
Juncus × stuckeyi Reinking
Juncus stygius L.
Juncus subcaudatus (Engelm.) Coville & S.F.Blake
Juncus subglaucus L.A.S.Johnson
Juncus subnodulosus Schrank
Juncus subsecundus N.A.Wakef.
Juncus subtilis E.Mey.
Juncus subulatus Forssk.
Juncus subulitepalus Balslev
Juncus supiniformis Engelm.
Juncus taonanensis Satake & Kitag.
Juncus tenageia Ehrh. ex L.f.
Juncus tenuis Willd.
Juncus texanus (Engelm.) Coville
Juncus textilis Buchenau
Juncus thomasii Ten.
Juncus thompsonianus L.A.S.Johnson
Juncus thomsonii Buchenau
Juncus tiehmii Ertter
Juncus tingitanus Maire & Weiller
Juncus tobdeniorum Noltie
Juncus torreyi Coville
Juncus trachyphyllus Miyam. & H.Ohba
Juncus trichophyllus W.W.Sm.
Juncus triformis Engelm.
Juncus triglumis L.
Juncus trigonocarpus Steud.
Juncus trilocularis Zika
Juncus turkestanicus V.I.Krecz. & Gontsch.
Juncus uncialis Greene
Juncus uniflorus W.W.Sm.
Juncus uruguensis Griseb.
Juncus usitatus L.A.S.Johnson
Juncus vaginatus R.Br.
Juncus × valbrayi H.Lév.
Juncus validus Coville
Juncus valvatus Link
Juncus vaseyi Engelm.
Juncus venturianus Castillón
Juncus virens Buchenau
Juncus wallichianus J.Gay ex Laharpe
Juncus xiphioides E.Mey.
Juncus yui S.Y.Bao

References

 
Poales genera
Taxa named by Carl Linnaeus